Listrocerum aeolis is a species of beetle in the family Cerambycidae. It was described by Thomson in 1857, originally under the genus Psathyrus. It is known from Mozambique, Ethiopia, Tanzania, Namibia, Kenya, Uganda, South Africa, and Zimbabwe.

References

Dorcaschematini
Beetles described in 1857